Collar color is a set of terms denoting groups of working individuals based on the colors of their collars worn at work. These can commonly reflect one's occupation within a broad class, or sometimes gender; at least in the late 20th and 21st century, these are generally metaphorical and not a description of typical present apparel. For the two terms of longest use, white-collar workers are named for the white-collared shirts that were fashionable among office workers in the early and mid-20th century. Blue-collar workers are referred to as such because in the early 20th century, they usually wore sturdy, inexpensive clothing that did not show dirt easily, such as blue denim or cambric shirts.

Various other "collar" descriptions exist as well, although none have received the kind of broad use in American English as the traditional white-collar/blue-collar distinction.

White collar

The term "white-collar worker" was coined in the 1930s by Upton Sinclair, an American writer who referenced the word in connection to clerical, administrative and managerial functions during the 1930s. A white-collar worker is a salaried professional, typically referring to general office workers and management.

Blue collar

A blue-collar worker is a member of the working class who performs manual labor and either earns an hourly wage or is paid piece rate for the amount of work done.  This term was first used in 1924.

Pink collar 

A pink-collar worker is also a member of the working class who performs in the service industry. They work in positions such as waiters, retail clerks, salespersons, certain unlicensed assistive personnel, and many other positions involving relations with people. The term was coined in the late 1970s as a phrase to describe jobs that were typically held by women; now the meaning has changed to encompass all service jobs.

Other classifications
There are a number of other terms used less frequently, or which translate to English from common use in other languages. These categories include:

Red collar – Government workers of all types; derived from compensation received from red ink budget. In China, it also refers to Communist Party officials in private companies.
New collar – Develops technical and soft skills through nontraditional education paths
No collar – Artists and "free spirits" who tend to privilege passion and personal growth over financial gain. This term was popularized on the reality game show Survivor: Worlds Apart, which used No Collar (in addition to White and Blue Collar) as the tribal divisions; also, people who work, but not for payment.
Orange collar – Prison laborers, named for the orange jumpsuits commonly worn by inmates.
Green collar – Usually referring to military personnel can include workers in a wide range of professions relating to the environment and renewable  energy.
Scarlet collar – Workers in the sex industry
Black collar – Manual laborers in industries in which workers generally become very dirty, such as mining or oil-drilling; has also been used to describe workers in illegal professions.
Grey collar – Workforce that is not classified in blue collar nor white collar. It is occasionally used to describe elderly individuals working beyond the age of retirement, as well as those occupations incorporating elements of both blue- and white-collar.
Gold collar – Refers to highly-skilled knowledgeable people such as doctors, lawyers, scientists; and also young, low wage workers who also get parental support.

References

Employment classifications
Social classes
Color of clothing